Christina Maria Mitas  is a Canadian politician, who was elected to the Legislative Assembly of Ontario in the 2018 provincial election. She represents the riding of Scarborough Centre as a member of the Progressive Conservative Party of Ontario.

Before politics, Mitas worked as a teacher abroad and was President of the Ontario Institute for Studies in Education Alumni Association.

As an MPP Mitas served on the Legislative Assembly Standing Committees on Estimates, Public Accounts, and the Legislative Assembly. As part of a province-wide effort, Education Minister Stephen Lecce also named MPP Mitas as his advisor on strategies to fight bullying - in the role Mitas was tasked with speaking with students, parents, teachers and experts.

Mitas received attention for the introduction of Bill 39, the Change of Name Amendment Act, which, if passed, would ban people on Ontario’s sex offender registry from changing their names.

In May 2019, Mitas participated in a pro-life rally at Queen's Park hosted by March for Life, where she made a stage appearance.

In August 2021, Mitas was identified as one of only two Ontario PC MPPs to have not received COVID-19 vaccinations. She was able to avoid expulsion from the PC caucus by producing a medical exemption letter from a physician.

Electoral record

References

External links
 

Progressive Conservative Party of Ontario MPPs
21st-century Canadian politicians
Living people
21st-century Canadian women politicians
People from Scarborough, Toronto
Politicians from Toronto
Women MPPs in Ontario
Canadian people of Greek descent
Year of birth missing (living people)
University of Toronto alumni